The 2019 Philadelphia Soul season was the fourteenth season for the Philadelphia Soul in the Arena Football League. The Soul played at the Wells Fargo Center and were coached by Clint Dolezel for the 2019 season.

Standings

Schedule

Regular season
The 2019 regular season schedule was released on February 13, 2019. All times Eastern.

Postseason

Game summaries

References

Philadelphia Soul
Philadelphia Soul seasons
2019 in Philadelphia
Philadelphia Soul